Qeshlaq-e Mira Alam (also Romanized as Qeshlāq-e Mīrā ʿAlam) is a village in Qeshlaq-e Sharqi Rural District, Qeshlaq Dasht District, Bileh Savar County, Ardabil Province, Iran. At the 2006 census, its population was 33, in 8 families.

References 

Towns and villages in Bileh Savar County